The list of shipwrecks in May 1923 includes ships sunk, foundered, grounded, or otherwise lost during May 1923.

3 May

4 May

7 May

9 May

10 May

14 May

16 May

19 May

20 May

21 May

22 May

26 May

27 May

29 May

31 May

References

1923-05
Maritime incidents in May 1923
05
May 1923 events